The 2009 Army Black Knights football team represented the United States Military Academy (USMA or "West Point") as an independent during the 2009 NCAA Division I FBS football season. Led by first-year head coach Rich Ellerson, the Black Knights finished the season with a record of 5–7.

Schedule

Personnel

Game summaries

Eastern Michigan

Duke

Ball State

Iowa State

Tulane

Vanderbilt

Temple

Rutgers

Air Force

VMI

North Texas

vs. Navy

The loss knocked Army out of a bowl bid.

References

Army
Army Black Knights football seasons
Army Black Knights football